Ancistrus erinaceus is a species of catfish in the family Loricariidae. It is native to South America, where it is reportedly known from Chile. The species reaches 7.5 cm (3 inches) SL.

References 

erinaceus
Fish described in 1840
Catfish of South America
Freshwater fish of Chile